A cacodemon (or cacodaemon) is an evil spirit or (in the modern sense of the word) a demon. The opposite of a cacodemon is an agathodaemon or eudaemon, a good spirit or angel. The word cacodemon comes through Latin from the Ancient Greek κακοδαίμων kakodaimōn, meaning an "evil spirit", whereas daimon would be a neutral spirit in Greek. It is believed to be capable of shapeshifting. A cacodemon is also said to be a malevolent person.

In psychology, cacodemonia (or cacodemonomania) is a form of insanity in which the patient believes that they are possessed by an evil spirit. The first known occurrence of the word cacodemon dates to 1593. In William Shakespeare's Richard III Act 1 Scene 3, Queen Margaret calls Richard a "cacodemon" for his foul deeds and manipulations. In John Fletcher's The Knight of Malta, Norandine calls Mountferrat, the play's villain, a "cacodemon" in the final scene. In The Arbatel de Magi Veterum, written in 1575, the word Cacodemon is described as one of the Seven.

In astrology, the 12th house was once called the Cacodemon for its association with evil. Defined it as "a noise-making devil", Jane Davidson has noted an illustrated example of a cacodemon in editions of Ulisse Aldrovandi’s Monstrum Historia (Story of Monsters) as late as 1696.

In popular culture
In the book and TV series The Magicians by Lev Grossman the main characters each have a Cacodemon magically implanted into their backs.
 Kelley Armstrong's Women of the Otherworld novels feature cacodemons and eudemons, some of whom have produced semi-human-like progeny; in this context eudemons are not so much "good" as "non-chaotic".
Deicide's second album, Legion, contains a song called "Satan Spawn, the Caco-Daemon".
Nunslaughter's second full album, Goat, contains a song called "As the Cacodemons Feast". 
There is a painting by Paul Klee called Cacodaemonic (1916).
There is a boulder in Squamish, Canada called Cacodemon; it is the location of the climb Dreamcatcher, a 5.14d (9a) first climbed by Chris Sharma.
 There's a Cacodemon in the sewers of Wormy's lair in the Wormy comics for Dragon Magazine (124) by David A. Trampier. It is never shown, but when Grumble and Snaggly escape from Boon and Irvin in the sewers with half the payroll, Irvin says to Boon to lock the grate  back as the treasure now belongs to the Cacodemon that lives in the sewers, the reason why Wormy kept it locked up.

Games
In the first edition of Advanced Dungeons & Dragons, "Cacodemon" is a seventh level magic-user spell. It was used to summon a type IV, V, or VI demon to the player character's location in the game world. The spell was omitted from the early versions of the second edition of the game, and was later revised in the Planescape product line, in which it could summon a variety of powerful tanar'ri or baatezu. The spell was eventually phased out in the third edition of the Dungeons & Dragons game in favor of a more comprehensive creature-summoning spell.
 In the fantasy video game Baldur's Gate II: Shadows of Amn, the BioWare Infinity Engine equivalent of the "Cacodemon" spell is known as "Cacofiend".
 In the fantasy world Glorantha, Cacodemon is the god of lawlessness and ogres.
 In the Doom video game series developed by id Software, Cacodemons are an enemy, depicted as levitating, spherical, one-eyed monsters that fire burning projectiles. They have appeared in every game of the series.
 In Final Fantasy XI MMORPG, the Terrestrial Avatar Diabolos uses a special attack called "Cacodemonia".
 In Anarchy Online MMORPG, a pet that one of the professions can summon is the Cacodemon.
 In Wizardry V: Heart of the Maelstrom, Cacodaemons are large red demons encountered on floor 777.
 In the Pathfinder Roleplaying Game, cacodaemons are many-eyed, tadpolish daemons used as pets by greater ones and as familiars by spellcasters.
 In Smite, there is a set of three Cacodemon skins for the playable God Ymir.
 In Magic: The Gathering, Dread Cacodemon is a card from the Commander expansion.
 In Dungeon Crawl Stone Soup, Cacodemons are large, yellow demons who attack with projectiles and hexes.
In Final Fantasy XIV: Endwalker, a "kakodaimon" is part of a pivotal combat encounter.

See also
 Genius (mythology)
 Greek mythology
 Ancient Greek religion

References

Further reading
 

16th-century neologisms
Demons
Shapeshifting
Daimons